Sylvia Chin-Pi Lu (1928–2014) was a Taiwanese-American mathematician specializing in commutative algebra who was an invited speaker at the 1990 International Congress of Mathematicians in Kyoto. Less than 5% of ICM speakers in algebra and number theory have been women, placing Lu in a rarefied group in this "hall of fame for mathematics". Lu's most highly cited papers are on the properties of prime submodules.

Education

Lu received her dissertation from The Pennsylvania State University in 1963, under the direction of Raymond Ayoub.

References

1928 births
2014 deaths
20th-century women mathematicians
21st-century women mathematicians
American women mathematicians
American academics of Taiwanese descent
Taiwanese emigrants to the United States
20th-century American mathematicians
21st-century American mathematicians
Eberly College of Science alumni
20th-century American women
21st-century American women